Varioconus is a synonym of Conus (Lautoconus) Monterosato, 1923: synonym of Conus Linnaeus, 1758. These are sea snails, marine gastropod mollusks in the family Conidae, the cone snails and their allies.

Species
 Varioconus bocagei (Trovão, 1978) represented as Conus bocagei Trovão, 1978 (alternate representation)
 Varioconus inesae Monteiro, Afonso, Tenorio, Rosado & Pirinhas, 2014 represented as Conus inesae (Monteiro, Afonso, Tenorio, Rosado & Pirinhas, 2014) (alternate representation)
 Varioconus medvedevi Monteiro, Afonso, Tenorio, Rosado & Pirinhas, 2014 represented as Conus medvedevi (Monteiro, Afonso, Tenorio, Rosado & Pirinhas, 2014) (alternate representation)
 Varioconus petuchi Monteiro, Afonso, Tenorio, Rosado & Pirinhas, 2014 represented as Conus petuchi (Monteiro, Afonso, Tenorio, Rosado & Pirinhas, 2014)

 Varioconus aemulus (Reeve, 1844): synonym of Conus aemulus Reeve, 1844 
 Varioconus africanus (Kiener, 1845): synonym of Conus africanus Kiener, 1845 
 Varioconus albuquerquei (Trovão, 1978): synonym of Conus albuquerquei Trovão, 1978 
 Varioconus alexandrinus (Kaicher, 1977): synonym of Conus alexandrinus Kaicher, 1977
 Varioconus allaryi (Bozzetti, 2008): synonym of Conus allaryi Bozzetti, 2008 
 Varioconus anabelae (Rolán & Röckel, 2001): synonym of Conus anabelae Rolán & Röckel, 2001 
 Varioconus babaensis (Rolán & Röckel, 2001): synonym of Conus babaensis Rolán & Röckel, 2001 
 Varioconus bulbus (Reeve, 1843): synonym of Conus bulbus Reeve, 1843 
 Varioconus cepasi (Trovão, 1975): synonym of Conus cepasi Trovão, 1975 
 Varioconus chytreus (Tryon, 1884): synonym of Conus chytreus Tryon, 1884 
 Varioconus filmeri (Rolán & Röckel, 2000): synonym of Conus filmeri Rolán & Röckel, 2000 
 Varioconus flavusalbus (Rolán & Röckel, 2000): synonym of Conus flavusalbus Rolán & Röckel, 2000 
 Varioconus franciscoi (Rolán & Röckel, 2000): synonym of Conus franciscoi Rolán & Röckel, 2000 
 Varioconus fuscolineatus (G.B. Sowerby III, 1905): synonym of Conus fuscolineatus G. B. Sowerby III, 1905 
 Varioconus gabrielae (Rolán & Röckel, 2000): synonym of Conus gabrielae Rolán & Röckel, 2000 
 Varioconus jourdani (da Motta, 1984): synonym of Conus jourdani da Motta, 1984 
 Varioconus lineopunctatus (Kaicher, 1977): synonym of Conus lineopunctatus Kaicher, 1977
 Varioconus lobitensis (Kaicher, 1977): synonym of Conus lobitensis Kaicher, 1977
 Varioconus micropunctatus (Rolán & Röckel, 2000): synonym of Conus micropunctatus Rolán & Röckel, 2000 
 Varioconus naranjus (Trovão, 1975): synonym of Conus naranjus Trovão, 1975 
 Varioconus negroides (Kaicher, 1977): synonym of Conus negroides Kaicher, 1977
 Varioconus neoguttatus (da Motta, 1991): synonym of Conus lineopunctatus Kaicher, 1977
 Varioconus nobrei (Trovão, 1975): synonym of Conus nobrei Trovão, 1975 
 Varioconus tenuilineatus (Rolán & Röckel, 2001): synonym of Conus tenuilineatus Rolán & Röckel, 2001 
 Varioconus tevesi (Trovão, 1978): synonym of Conus tevesi Trovão, 1978 
 Varioconus trovaoi (Rolán & Röckel, 2000): synonym of Conus trovaoi Rolán & Röckel, 2000 
 Varioconus variegatus (Kiener, 1845): synonym of Conus variegatus Kiener, 1845 
 Varioconus xicoi (Röckel, 1987): synonym of Conus xicoi Röckel, 1987 
 Varioconus zebroides (Kiener, 1845): synonym of Conus zebroides Kiener, 1845

References

External links
 To World Register of Marine Species

Conidae